Letícia Cristina Laurindo Moraes is a Brazilian weightlifter. She won the bronze medal in women's 55kg event at the 2022 South American Games held in Asunción, Paraguay.

She won the bronze medal in her event at the 2022 Pan American Weightlifting Championships held in Bogotá, Colombia.

References

External links 
 

Living people
Year of birth missing (living people)
Place of birth missing (living people)
Brazilian female weightlifters
Weightlifters at the 2015 Pan American Games
Pan American Games competitors for Brazil
Pan American Weightlifting Championships medalists
South American Games bronze medalists for Brazil
South American Games medalists in weightlifting
Competitors at the 2022 South American Games
21st-century Brazilian women